The Mariana Trench is an oceanic trench located in the western Pacific Ocean, about  east of the Mariana Islands; it is the deepest oceanic trench on Earth.

At this pressure, the density of water is increased by 4.96%.

In 2009, the Mariana Trench was established as a US National Monument. Data has also suggested that microbial life forms thrive within the trench.

Etymology
The Mariana Trench is named after the nearby Mariana Islands, which are named Las Marianas in honor of Spanish Queen Mariana of Austria. The islands are part of the island arc that is formed on an over-riding plate, called the Mariana Plate (also named for the islands), on the western side of the trench.

Geology

The Mariana Trench is part of the Izu–Bonin–Mariana subduction system that forms the boundary between two tectonic plates. In this system, the western edge of one plate, the Pacific Plate, is subducted (i.e., thrust) beneath the smaller Mariana Plate that lies to the west. Crustal material at the western edge of the Pacific Plate is some of the oldest oceanic crust on Earth (up to 170 million years old), and is, therefore, cooler and denser; hence its great height difference relative to the higher-riding (and younger) Mariana Plate. The deepest area at the plate boundary is the Mariana Trench proper.

The movement of the Pacific and Mariana plates is also indirectly responsible for the formation of the Mariana Islands. These volcanic islands are caused by flux melting of the upper mantle due to the release of water that is trapped in minerals of the subducted portion of the Pacific Plate.

Research history

In 1877, a map was published called Tiefenkarte des Grossen Ozeans ("Depth map of the Great Ocean") by Petermann, which showed a Challenger Tief ("Challenger deep") at the location of that sounding.

In 1951, Challenger II surveyed the trench using echo sounding, a much more precise and vastly easier way to measure depth than the sounding equipment and drag lines used in the original expedition.

In 1962, the surface ship M.V. Spencer F. Baird recorded a maximum depth of  using precision depth gauges.

During surveys carried out between 1997 and 2001, a spot was found along the Mariana Trench that had a depth similar to the Challenger Deep, possibly even deeper. It was discovered while scientists from the Hawaii Institute of Geophysics and Planetology were completing a survey around Guam; they used a sonar mapping system towed behind the research ship to conduct the survey. This new spot was named the HMRG (Hawaii Mapping Research Group) Deep, after the group of scientists who discovered it.

The sonar mapping of the Challenger Deep was possible by its Simrad EM120 sonar multibeam bathymetry system for deep water. The sonar system uses phase and amplitude bottom detection, with an accuracy of better than 0.2% of water depth across the entire swath (implying that the depth figure is accurate to ± ).

In 2011, it was announced at the American Geophysical Union Fall Meeting that a US Navy hydrographic ship equipped with a multibeam echosounder conducted a survey which mapped the entire trench to  resolution. The mapping revealed the existence of four rocky outcrops thought to be former seamounts.

The Mariana Trench is a site chosen by researchers at Washington University in St. Louis and the Woods Hole Oceanographic Institution in 2012 for a seismic survey to investigate the subsurface water cycle. Using both ocean-bottom seismometers and hydrophones, the scientists are able to map structures as deep as  beneath the surface.

Descents

As of 2022, 22 crewed descents and seven uncrewed descents have been achieved. The first was the crewed descent by Swiss-designed, Italian-built, United States Navy-owned bathyscaphe Trieste, which reached the bottom at 1:06 pm on 23 January 1960, with Don Walsh and Jacques Piccard on board. Iron shot was used for ballast, with gasoline for buoyancy. The depth was estimated from a conversion of pressure measured and calculations based on the water density from sea surface to seabed.

This was followed by the uncrewed ROVs Kaikō in 1996 and Nereus in 2009. The fourth was made by Canadian film director James Cameron on 26 March 2012.

In July 2015, members of the National Oceanic and Atmospheric Administration, Oregon State University, and the Coast Guard submerged a hydrophone into the deepest part of the Mariana Trench, the Challenger Deep, never having previously deployed one past a mile. The titanium-shelled hydrophone was designed to withstand the immense pressure 7 miles under. Although researchers were unable to retrieve the hydrophone until November, the data capacity was full within the first 23 days. After months of analyzing the sounds, the experts were surprised to pick up natural sounds like earthquakes, typhoons, baleen whales, and machine-made sounds such as boats. Due to the mission's success, the researchers announced plans to deploy a second hydrophone in 2017 for an extended period of time.

He dived four times between 28 April and 5 May 2019, becoming the first person to dive into Challenger Deep more than once.

Vityaz-D is the first underwater vehicle to operate autonomously at the extreme depths of the Mariana Trench. The duration of the mission, excluding diving and surfacing, was more than 3 hours.

Life 
According to Piccard, "The bottom appeared light and clear, a waste of firm diatomaceous ooze". Many marine biologists are now skeptical of the supposed sighting of the flatfish, and it is suggested that the creature may instead have been a sea cucumber. During the second expedition, the uncrewed vehicle Kaikō collected mud samples from the seabed. Tiny organisms were found to be living in those samples.

In July 2011, a research expedition deployed untethered landers, called drop cams, equipped with digital video cameras and lights to explore this deep-sea region. Monothalamea are noteworthy for their size, their extreme abundance on the seafloor, and their role as hosts for a variety of organisms.

During the 2014 expedition, several new species were filmed, including huge amphipods known as supergiants. Deep-sea gigantism is the process where species grow larger than their shallow-water relatives.

Pollution
In 2016, a research expedition looked at the chemical makeup of crustacean scavengers collected from the range of  within the trench. Within these organisms, the researchers found extremely elevated concentrations of PCBs, a chemical toxin banned in the 1970s for its environmental harm, concentrated at all depths within the sediment of the trench. Further research has found that amphipods also ingest microplastics, with 100% of amphipods having at least one piece of synthetic material in their stomachs.

In 2019, Victor Vescovo reported finding a plastic bag and candy wrappers at the bottom of the trench. That year, Scientific American also reported that carbon-14 from nuclear bomb testing has been found in the bodies of aquatic animals found in the trench.

Possible nuclear waste disposal site
Like other oceanic trenches, the Mariana Trench has been proposed as a site for nuclear waste disposal in the hope that tectonic plate subduction occurring at the site might eventually push the nuclear waste deep into the Earth's mantle, the second layer of the Earth. However, ocean dumping of nuclear waste is prohibited by international law. Furthermore, plate subduction zones are associated with very large megathrust earthquakes, the effects of which are unpredictable for the safety of long-term disposal of nuclear wastes within the hadopelagic ecosystem.

See also

 Marianas Trench Marine National Monument, United States national monument at the trench. This National Monument protects  of submerged lands and waters of the Mariana Archipelago. It includes some of the Mariana Trench, but not the deepest part, the Challenger Deep, which lies just outside the monument area.
 Challenger Deep
 Litke Deep, closest point to Earth's center

Notes

References

External links

Mariana Trench Dive (25 March 2012) – Deepsea Challenger
Mariana Trench Dive (23 January 1960) – Trieste (Newsreel)
Mariana Trench Dive (50th Anniv)  – Trieste – Capt Don Walsh
Mariana Trench – Maps (Google)
NOAA – Ocean Explorer (Ofc Ocean Exploration & Rsch)
NOAA – Ocean Explorer – Multimedia – Mariana Arc (podcast)
NOAA – Ocean Explorer – Video Playlist – Ring of Fire (2004–2006)

Philippine Sea
Oceanic trenches of the Pacific Ocean
Extreme points of Earth
Subduction zones
Lowest points of the World Ocean